Sorbo San Basile is a village and comune in the province of Catanzaro in the Calabria region of southern Italy.  The word "sorbo" in Italian means "the service tree or the sorb-apple tree" of which there are many orchards in the vicinity.  The words "San Basile" refer to the Greek Saint Basil the Great because Basilian monks established a monastery in the area as early as 640.

The town is bordered by Bianchi, Carlopoli, Cicala, Colosimi, Fossato Serralta, Gimigliano, Panettieri, Taverna.

References

External links
Official website

Cities and towns in Calabria